Brad Inwood (born 23 July 1963) is an Australian cricketer. He played in seven first-class and nine List A matches for Queensland between 1986 and 1992.

See also
 List of Queensland first-class cricketers

References

External links
 

1963 births
Living people
Australian cricketers
Queensland cricketers
People from Gladstone, Queensland
Cricketers from Queensland